As one of the most prominent Canadian children's music acts, the Sharon, Lois & Bram and Sharon, Bram & Friends discographies are quite extensive.

1970s
 One Elephant, Deux Éléphants/One Elephant 1985 A&M Records/One Elephant Went Out To Play 1994 DRIVE ent. 1978. Elephant Records. / 2002. Casablanca Kids Inc.
 Smorgasbord. 1979. Elephant Records. / 2006. Casablanca Kids Inc.

1980s
 Singing 'n' Swinging. 1980. Elephant Records. / 1996. Drive Entertainment.
 In the Schoolyard. 1981. Elephant Records. / 2007. Casablanca Kids Inc.
 One, Two, Three, Four, Live!/ In Concert 1996. 1982. Elephant Records.
 Mainly Mother Goose. 1984. Elephant Records. / 1984. Drive Entertainment / 2004. Casablanca Kids Inc.
 Sharon, Lois & Bram's Elephant Show Record/ The Elephant Show Volume 1 1996/ The Elephant Show 1994 Drive Entertainment. 1986. Elephant Records. 2009 Casablanca Kids Inc.
 Stay Tuned/ The Elephant Show Volume 2 1996. 1987. Elephant Records.
 Happy Birthday/ Elephant Party 1996 Drive Entertainment. 1988. Elephant Records.
 Car Tunes for Summertime. 1989. Elephant Records.
 Car Tunes about Animals. 1989. Elephant Records.
 Car Tunes from Around The World. 1989 Elephant Records
 Car Tunes for Sleepytime. 1989. Elephant Records.

1990s
 Car Tunes for Elephant Showstoppers. 1990. Elephant Records.
 Car Tunes for Schooldays. 1990. Elephant Records.
 Car Tunes for After School. 1990. Elephant Records.
 Car Tunes for Naming Games. 1990. Elephant Records.
 Sing A to Z. 1990. Elephant Records. / 1994. Drive Entertainment.
 Kidbits. Elephant Records. 1992.
 Great Big Hits. 1992. A&M Records. / 1992. Elephant Records.
 Songs in the Key of Kids. 1993. Drive Entertainment.
 Candles, Snow & Mistletoe 1993. Elephant Records. / Drive Entertainment. / 2000. Casablanca Kids Inc. / "Family Christmas" 2009 Casablanca Kids Inc.
 Candles Long Ago 1993. Elephant Records/ Drive Entertainment.
 All The Fun You Can Sing! 1993. Elephant Records. / 1994. Drive Entertainment.
 Club-E Collection 1994. Drive Entertainment / 1994. Elephant Records / 1995. Gap Inc.
 Sing Around the Campfire. 1994. Elephant Records. / 1995. Drive Entertainment.
 Sharon, Lois & Bram Sampler 1995. Drive Entertainment
 Kid Bits Vol. 1, 2 & 3 1995. Drive Entertainment.
 Let's Dance! 1995. Elephant Records. / 1995. Drive Entertainment.
 Car Tunes Vol. 1 1995. Elephant Records. / 1995. Sears KidVantage.
 Car Tunes Vol. 2 1995. Elephant Records. / 1995. Sears KidVantage.
 Car Tunes Vol. 3 1995. Elephant Records. / 1995. Sears KidVantage.
 Car Tunes Vol. 4 1995. Elephant Records. / 1995. Sears KidVantage.
 Wild About Animals 1997. Elephant Records.
 Friends Forever 1998. Skinnamarink Entertainment.
 Skinnamarink TV. 1998. Skinnamarink Entertainment.
 Silly & Sweet Songs. 1999. Skinnamarink Entertainment.

2000s
 Travellin' Tunes. 2001. Mother's Love Records.
 Great Big Hits 2. 2002. Elephant Records. / 2002. Casablanca Kids Inc.
 Mother Goose & More. 2002. Fisher-Price Inc.
 Name Games. 2002. Casablanca Kids Inc.
 School Days. 2004. Casablanca Kids Inc.
 Everybody Sing! 2004. Casablanca Kids Inc.
 Sleepytime. 2004. Casablanca Kids Inc.
 1, 2, 3, 4 LIVE! 2016. Skinnamarink Entertainment.

2010s
 Sharon & Bram and Friends. 2019. Casablanca Kids Inc.

2020s
 Best of the Best Live. 2021. Red Brick Songs, Inc. 
 A Little Bit Country. 2023. Red Brick Songs, Inc.

Discographies of Canadian artists